This is a list of television stations in Thailand

Broadcast channels
All analogue television stations completely switched over to digital since 26 March 2020. Channel 3 was the last station that ceased broadcasting on analogue television.

Public broadcasting
2. National Broadcasting Services of Thailand (NBT2HD)
3. Thai Public Broadcasting Service (Thai PBS)
4. ALTV (ThaiPBS Active Learning TV)
5. Royal Thai Army Radio and Television (TV5 HD)
7. T Sports (7) 
10. Thai Parliament Television (TPTV)
11. NBT Regional 11 (Broadcast in each region to 4 sectors, to consist of)
 NBT North (Main Station in Chiang Mai, Broadcast in the Northern Region and Lopburi)
 NBT Northeast (Main Station in Khon Kaen, Broadcast in the Northeastern Region)
 NBT Central (Main Station in Chanthaburi, Broadcast in the Central, Western, Eastern Region and including Bangkok)
 NBT South (Main Station in Surat Thani, Broadcast in the Southern Region)

Channel 1, 6, 8-9 and 12 would be chosen through a beauty contest format.

Children's
13. Not on Air (Formerly Broadcast by Channel 3 Family (BEC Multimedia) (Now all program was forced to move Channel 3 HD)

News
16. TNN 16 (Thai News Network)
18. JKN 18 (JKN Best Life)
21. Not on Air (Formerly Broadcast by Voice TV 21 (Voice TV Co. Ltd.) (Now still broadcast on satellite and cable))
22. Nation TV  (NBC)

General entertainment – standard-definition 
23. Workpoint (Thai Broadcasting)
24. True4U (True4U Station)
25. GMM 25 (GMM Channel Holding)
27. Channel 8 (RS Television)
28. Not on Air (Formerly Broadcast by Channel 3 SD (BEC Multimedia) (Now all program was forced to move to Channel 3 HD)
29. MONO29 (MONO Next)

General entertainment – high-definition
30. MCOT HD 
31. ONE 31 (HD) (The One Enterprise)
32. Thairath TV (Triple V Broadcast)
33. Channel 3 HD (BEC Multimedia) 
34. Amarin TV (Amarin Television)
35. Channel 7 HD (BBTV-Bangkok Broadcasting & T.V. Company Limited)
36. PPTV HD36 (Bangkok Media & Broadcasting)

Education
All Stations Temporary to Broadcast on Terrestrial Television in Just 6 Months (From 18 May-15 November 2020), Due to the situation of the epidemic of COVID-19. 
37-51. DLTV (Distance Learning Television)
52. ETV (Educational Television Ministry of Education, Owner by Office of the Non-formal and informal Education)
53. VECTV (Owner by Office of the Vocational Education Commission)

Cable, satellite, and IPTV channels
BabyTV
Boomerang
Cartoon Club Channel
Chocolate TV
Cinemax
Crime & Investigation Network
Da Vinci Learning
DLTV (Distance Learning Television:15 Channels)
ETV (Educational Television Ministry of Education) 
Faikham Internet TV
Fan Music
Filmagix Asia
Gang Cartoon Channel
HBO
HBO Family
HBO Hits
HBO HD
HBO Signature
ILearn
JatingJa
Joy TV
Khongdee Thailand
MV TV 
Miracle Channel
MySci
Nat Geo Music
Nat Geo Wild
NBT World (Owner by National News Bureau of Thailand)
NEWS1
Nick Jr.
NRI
Peace TV
Police TV
Pop Channel 
PSI Saradee
Samrujlok
Smile Movies 1 
Smile Movies 2 
Siam Sport
TGN
ToonToon
TV 24
TV Muslim Thailand
Warner Channel

TrueVisions

TrueVisions Homemade channels 
True Korean More
True Select
True4U
True Chinese More
True Asian More
True Film (HD 1 & 2)
True Film Asia 
True Inside
True Plook Panya
Reality
True Series
True Spark Play
True Spark Jump
True Sport 1 
True Sport 2 
True Sport 3 
True Tennis HD 
True Sport 5 
True Sport 6
True Sport 7
True Sport HD1
True Sport HD2
True Sport HD3
True Sport HD4
True Thai Film
True X-Zyte 
True Shopping 
True Explore Wild
True Explore Life
True Explore Sci
True Movie Hits
True Music
TNN 16
TNN 2

Channels provided by TrueVisions
AXN Asia 
Animax Asia
Gem TV Asia
SPOTV Network
SPOTV
SPOTV2
BBC Network 
BBC World 
BBC Earth
BBC Lifestyle
beIN Sports
Rock Entertainment
Rock Extreme
Cartoon Network 
CCTV-4 
CCTV News
Chic Channel 
CNBC Asia 
CNN International
Deutsche Welle
Discovery Networks 
Discovery Channel
Discovery Science
Animal Planet
Discovery Asia
TLC
DreamWorks Network
DreamWorks Channel
Fashion Network
Fashion TV
Fashion One
Food Network
Golf Network
Golf Channel
History Network 
History
H2
iConcerts
KBS World
KMTV
Lifetime
MGM Channel
Money Channel
Motovision
Moviemania 
MTV Thailand
National Geographic 
NBA TV
NHK World
Nickelodeon
Nickelodeon Junior 
Outdoor Channel
Panorama 07 
Paramount Network
Phoenix InfoNews
Popper 
Rakthai TV 
RT
TV5
Warner Channel
World Fashion Thailand
YTN

Defunct channels provided by TrueVisions
Bloomberg
CBeebies
ABC Australia
Cinemax
DMAX
Discovery Kids
Disney XD
Disney Junior
Disney Channel
Eve
HBO
HBO Family
HBO Hits
HBO HD
HBO Signature
Red by HBO
Sony Channel
Sports Illustrated
Life Inspired
FOX Movies
FOX Family Movies
FOX Action Movies
Channel V
Channel V Thailand
FOX Sports
FOX Sports 2
FOX Sports 3
FOX Thailand
Sundance Channel
TCM Channel
BeTV
Al Jazeera
CCTV-4

Good TV

Good TV channels 
Samrujlok
MySci
Animal Show
Thainess TV
Khongdee Thailand
Busaba Café
BXCITE
hero (Thai channel)
Just Fun
Real Metro
next KID
new explorer
Sweet music
heart (channel)

Channels provided by Good TV
NHK World
France 24

Defunct channels provided by Good TV 
FOX Movies
FOX Family Movies
FOX Action Movies
Star Chinese Movies
Fox Thailand
Fox Crime
FX
Fox Life
Nat Geo Wild

Defunct television station

Terrestrial television

Analogue stations 
 Television of Thailand (later NBT since 2008)
 HSATV Channel 7 (later TV5 since 1974)
 TTV Channel 4 (later to TTV Channel 9 since 1970, M.C.O.T. Channel 9 in 1977 and Modernine TV in 2002 to 2015)
 Channel 3 (BEC-Bangkok Entertainment Company, under license from MCOT) (Defunct in 2020, Now all program was forced to move Digital TV Station on 3 HD)
 ITV (Thailand) (Later TITV in 2007 and TPBS in 2008 (Now renamed as ThaiPBS))

Digital stations 
 Channel 3 Family
 MCOT Family
 LOCA TV MVTV Family
 Thai TV (Formerly THV)
 Spring News
 Bright TV (th)
 Voice TV 21
 Spring 26
 Channel 3 SD

Cable and satellite television 
 Animax (Selection Pay TV Provider Only)
 ASTV (Now NEWS1 in 2014)
 Channel 2
 Green Channel
 Bang Channel
 Cartoonito
 Channel 6 (now Toonami)
 DMC
 GTH On Air
 Jewelry Channel
 JimJam
 KidsCo
 Live TV
 PTV
 Smile TV Network
 Sports Illustrated
 Toonami
 Toon Channel (now True Spark Jump)
 T News
 MCOT 1
 MCOT World (Formerly MCOT 2 and changed name to ASEAN TV on 2009 to 2012)
 Media 84
 Channel V Thailand
 True Music
 Fan Music
 VERY TV
 MTV Thailand
 Channel 2
 JatingJa

See also
Media of Thailand

Stations
Thailand
Stations